Marion Gearhart "Mike" Dirks (born August 28, 1946) is a former American football defensive tackle who played in the National Football League (NFL) with the Philadelphia Eagles from 1968 to 1971 for a total of 43 games.

References

1946 births
Living people
American football defensive tackles
Philadelphia Eagles players
Wyoming Cowboys football players
People from Monticello, Iowa
Players of American football from Iowa